The 2005–06 Argentine Torneo Argentino A was the eleventh season of third division professional football in Argentina. A total of 24 teams competed; the champion was promoted to Primera B Nacional.

Club information

Zone A

Zone B

Apertura 2005

First stage

Zone A

Zone B

Final stage

1: Qualified because of sport advantage.
Note: The team in the first line plays at home the second leg.

Clausura 2006

First stage

Zone A

Zone B

Final stage

1: Qualified because of sport advantage.
Note: The team in the first line plays at home the second leg.

Overall standings

Zone A

Zone B

Championship final

Promotion/relegation playoff B Nacional-Torneo Argentino A

San Martín (T) was promoted to 2006–07 Primera B Nacional by winning the playoff and San Martin (T) was relegated to 2006–07 Torneo Argentino A.

Relegation playoff Qualifying

Lujan de Cuyo remains in Torneo Argentino A and Racing (O) played the Relegation Playoff.

Gimnasia y Esgrima (CdU) remains in Torneo Argentino A and Atlético Candelaria played the Relegation Playoff.

Additional Playoff

General Paz Juniors plays the Relegation Playoff and Cipolletti was relegated to 2006–07 Torneo Argentino B.

Relegation playoff

|-
!colspan="5"|Relegation/promotion playoff 1

|-
!colspan="5"|Relegation/promotion playoff 2

|-
!colspan="5"|Relegation/promotion playoff 3

Rivadavia (L) was promoted to 2006–07 Torneo Argentino A by winning the playoff and Racing (O) was relegated to 2006–07 Torneo Argentino B.
Real Arroyo Seco was promoted to 2006–07 Torneo Argentino A by winning the playoff and Atlético Candelaria was relegated to 2006–07 Torneo Argentino B.
Alumni (VM) was promoted to 2006–07 Torneo Argentino A by winning the playoff and General Paz Juniors was relegated to 2006–07 Torneo Argentino B.

See also
2005–06 in Argentine football

References

Torneo Argentino A seasons
3